Presidential elections were held in Austria on 25 April 2010, the twelfth election of an Austrian head of state since 1951. The candidates were President Heinz Fischer (independent, formerly SPÖ), Barbara Rosenkranz (FPÖ) and Rudolf Gehring (CPÖ). Heinz Fischer won with just under 80% of the valid votes. Voter turnout was a historic low of 54%.

Candidates

Social Democratic Party of Austria
Incumbent President Heinz Fischer (independent, former member of the Social Democratic Party) announced on 23 November 2009 that he will seek a second term. According to a 27 June 2009, Gallup poll for the newspaper Österreich, Fischer had a job approval rating of 80%.

Austrian People's Party
There were rumours that the candidate of the Austrian People's Party would be either Governor of Lower Austria Erwin Pröll or president of the Austrian Federal Economic Chamber Christoph Leitl. On 13 October 2009 Pröll announced that he would not run for the Presidency and that he would remain Governor of Lower Austria. Leitl and former governor of Styria Waltraud Klasnic also declined a presidential run. On 25 February 2010, the People's Party announced that it would not nominate a candidate, and would not officially support any candidate.

Freedom Party of Austria
The Freedom Party announced in June 2009 that it would definitely field a candidate "to prevent Fischer['s reelection]". Possible candidates mentioned included Martin Graf, Norbert Steger, Siegfried Dillersberger, Norbert Gugerbauer, Dieter Böhmdorfer and Wilhelm Brauneder. After the Carinthian branch of the Alliance for the Future of Austria broke away to re-unite with the Freedom Party, it was rumoured that Barbara Rosenkranz would be their candidate. In early January 2010, Heinz-Christian Strache, leader of the Freedom Party, guaranteed that the party would nominate a candidate to assure that Fischer would not run unopposed. On 28 February 2010, Strache announced in the Kronen Zeitung that the Freedom Party would nominate Barbara Rosenkranz as its presidential candidate.

Alliance for the Future of Austria
Alliance for the Future of Austria leader Josef Bucher and General Secretary Stefan Petzner voiced their support for a presidential candidacy of Claudia Haider, widow of former Alliance leader Jörg Haider, by inviting the Greens and the Freedom Party to form a non-partisan committee. Carinthia Governor Gerhard Dörfler spoke out against such a candidacy, because he "wouldn't like to join forces with Heinz-Christian Strache's [Freedom Party]", but nonetheless said that Claudia Haider would be a "good candidate, who could finance her campaign on her own". On 17 August, Haider announced that she would not run for president. On 26 February 2010, Bucher said that he might run as a candidate for his party, because "he could appeal to [People's Party] voters". On 1 March 2010, the Alliance announced that Bucher would not stand as a candidate, as the odds were clearly against him and they did not want to waste taxpayers' money.

The Greens – The Green Alternative
It was expected that former Green Party leader Alexander Van der Bellen might stand in the election, but he stated in January 2009 that if Fischer ran for reelection he would have his support. In June 2009, however, Green party leader Eva Glawischnig stated that the Greens were considering fielding a candidate, and that Van der Bellen would be a very good candidate. By November 2009, there was still no clear decision from the Greens, even though Van der Bellen had ruled out a run for the Presidency on 23 November 2009. On 25 February 2010, the Greens announced they wanted to concentrate on state elections and would not nominate a candidate. After Fischer appeared at an event where the Greens questioned him on a number of issues, with questions submitted by voters via the internet, the Greens on 12 April 2010 officially endorsed his candidacy and called for their voters to vote for him, a first in the party's history.

Christian Party of Austria
The Christian Party nominated its chairman Rudolf Gehring as a presidential candidate. On 25 March 2010, they announced they had gathered the necessary number signatures to run for president.

Other candidates
A former judge from eastern Styria, Martin Wabl, who had twice previously tried to run for president, announced on 6 February 2009 that he would run again. Green municipal councillor Ulrich Habsburg-Lothringen, as a descendant of the former ruling house of Austria-Hungary incapacitated by constitutional law to run for Austria's presidency, stated that he wanted to test the law at Austria's constitutional court if his candidacy is not permitted. Bernhard Gregor Honemann (nominated by the platform agenda2020.at) also planned to run. None of these candidates obtained the 6000 signatures necessary to run for president. The signatures submitted were:
 Fischer: 45,000 signatures
 Rosenkranz: 10,500 signatures
 Gehring: 8,000 signatures

Voter statistics
According to the federal election commission, 6,355,800 Austrian citizens aged 16+ were eligible to vote in the presidential election. Compared with the 2004 presidential election, the number of eligible voters increased by 324,818, or 5.4% – primarily due to lowering the legal voting age to 16 between the two elections. 3,307,366 women and 3,048,434 men were eligible to vote.

Total number of eligible voters by state:

 Burgenland: 231,257
 Carinthia: 447,679
 Lower Austria: 1,267,379
 Upper Austria: 1,092,760
 Salzburg: 391,142
 Styria: 973,009
 Tyrol: 530,265
 Vorarlberg: 265,026
 Vienna: 1,157,283

Opinion polls

Social Democrats v. Freedom Party v. Christian Party

Social Democrats v. Freedom Party

Social Democrats v. People's Party

All parties

Results
Heinz Fischer beat Barbara Rosenkranz by scoring 79.3% of the vote. Rosenkranz received 15.2%. Rudolf Gehring came third by scoring 5.4%.

Opinion polls had placed Fischer in a good position on the day of the election.

Fischer thanked the nation on television: "I am extremely happy and thank the Austrian population for having so much confidence in me".

Poor voter turnout – only 53.6% voted – led again to calls by leaders for the post to be abolished.

By state
<noinclude>

References

External links
 Heinz Fischer Campaign Website
 Barbara Rosenkranz Campaign Website 
 Rudolf Gehring Campaign Website
 NSD: European Election Database – Austria

Austria
President
Presidential elections in Austria
Austria